This is a list of notable male action heroes and villains.

List of heroes and villains

See also 
 List of action film actors
 List of female action heroes and villains
 Bruceploitation

References

Action (genre)